Donholm or Doonholm is a commercial and residential neighbourhood in Nairobi. A legacy of what was a dairy farm with the same name, Donholm is a suburb in the Eastlands area of Nairobi.

Location
It borders the Umoja, Tena, Savannah, and Kayole neighbourhoods.

Overview
Donholm is oldest estate amongst estates in the Eastlands area. Donholm's name comes from a colonial Kenya land and plantation owner James Kerr Watson (3 October 1881 – 11 November 1955), who gave the name "Doonholm" to his dairy farm in the area. The estate was 4600 acres by 1900 stretching from the City Stadium to where it stands now.

Donholm has various estates including: Harambee Sacco, Phase 5, Old Donholm, New Donholm and Phase 8 which also hold various Courts. It has increasingly turned into a high-density suburb, hosting the lower middle-income to low-income segment of Nairobi residents.

References 

Populated places in Nairobi Province
Suburbs of Nairobi